Orange is a surname and a given name.

Surname
 Anthony Orange (born 1988), Canadian football cornerback
 Bud Orange (Robert John Orange; 1926–2007), Canadian politician, civil servant and economist
 Dame Claudia Orange (born 1938), New Zealand historian
 Dip Orange (1900–1946), American Negro league baseball player
 Doyle Orange (born 1951), Canadian football running back
 James Orange (1943–2008), American civil rights activist
 Jason Orange (born 1970), British singer and Take That member
 Leroy Orange (born 1950), American citizen pardoned after wrongful murder conviction
 Linda Orange (1950–2019), American politician
 Maurice Orange (1867–1916), French painter and artist
 Noel Orange (1939–1995), Australian rules footballer
 Rhasaan Orange (born 1975), American actor
 Ursula Orange (1909–1955), British novelist
 Vincent Orange (born 1957), American politician

Given name
 Orange Cassidy (born 1984), American wrestler
 Orange Ferriss (1814–1894), U.S. Congressman
 Orange Jacobs (1827–1914), U.S. Congressman
 Orange Judd (1822–1892), American agriculturalist, editor, and publisher
 Orange Merwin (1777–1853), U.S. Congressman

See also
 DJ Orange (born 1974), Taiwanese musician
 Eutropius of Orange (died 475), bishop of Orange, France
 Florentius of Orange (died 525), bishop of Orange, France
 House of Orange-Nassau, the royal family of the Kingdom of the Netherlands

Given names
Surnames